The 1907 Anglesey by-election was a parliamentary by-election held for the House of Commons constituency of Anglesey in North Wales on 21 August 1907.

Vacancy
Under the provisions of the Succession to the Crown Act of 1707 and a number of subsequent Acts, MPs appointed to certain ministerial and legal offices were at this time required to seek re-election. The Anglesey by-election was caused by the appointment of the sitting Liberal MP, Ellis Griffith as Recorder of Birkenhead.

Candidates
Ellis Griffith fought the seat again in the Liberals interest. It was reported that the Conservatives were not expected to oppose his re-election. There was not yet any tradition of candidates from organised labour contesting elections in this part of the country and no nominations were put forward against Griffith who was therefore returned unopposed.

Result

References

See also
 1837 Anglesey by-election
 1923 Anglesey by-election
 List of United Kingdom by-elections 
 United Kingdom by-election records

Unopposed by-elections to the Parliament of the United Kingdom in Welsh constituencies
Unopposed ministerial by-elections to the Parliament of the United Kingdom in Welsh constituencies
Anglesey by-election
Anglesey by-election
1900s elections in Wales
History of Anglesey
Anglesey by-election